Shirley Young (May 25, 1935December 26, 2020) was an American businesswoman. She was an executive at Grey Advertising and later at General Motors (GM). She was also a cultural ambassador between the United States and China.

Biography 
Young was born in Shanghai. She was the daughter of Clarence Young, a Chinese diplomat, and Juliana Young Koo, a United Nations protocol expert, who was the long-term mistress for the diplomat and politician V.K. Wellington Koo, while her father was still living.

Young received a BA in economics, Phi Beta Kappa, from Wellesley College in 1955 and attended graduate school at New York University from 1956 to 1957.

Career 
She started at Grey Advertising in 1959 where she led an internal market research division until 1988; she was among the only women and Asian-American employees at the firm at the time. In 1963, when Young was pregnant with her first child, she forced Grey to rethink their maternity leave policies as she didn't leave the company or take the severance package they offered. She was the president of Grey Strategic Marketing, a research subsidiary of Grey as of 1983. In 1988 she was hired by General Motors. GM had been a client of Young's at Grey Advertising since at least 1985. At GM, Young led an initiative to help the firm regain market share, as its reputation was suffering in the early 1990s.

Young left GM in 2000 to found her own consulting firm, Shirley Young Associates, which advised US companies interested in Chinese opportunities.

Young helped to found the Committee of 100 and served as a chair of the organization, and used classical music to bridge divides between the United States and China.

Personal 
Young was married to George Hsieh. They had three sons, David, William and Douglas. They divorced and Young married Norman Krandall. That marriage also ended in divorce.

Publications

References

Further reading 
 
 

1935 births
2020 deaths
20th-century American businesswomen
20th-century American businesspeople
American advertising executives
General Motors executives
Wellesley College alumni
21st-century American women